Federico Cortés (born 24 November 1937) is a former Argentine cyclist. He competed in the team time trial at the 1960 Summer Olympics.

References

External links
 

1937 births
Living people
Argentine male cyclists
Olympic cyclists of Argentina
Cyclists at the 1960 Summer Olympics
Sportspeople from Jujuy Province
Pan American Games medalists in cycling
Pan American Games bronze medalists for Argentina
Competitors at the 1959 Pan American Games
Medalists at the 1959 Pan American Games